Alkhasly is a village in the Lachin District of Azerbaijan.

History 
Formerly part of Red Kurdistan and later the Kurdistan Okrug, the village was located in the Armenian-occupied territories surrounding Nagorno-Karabakh, coming under the control of ethnic Armenian forces during the First Nagorno-Karabakh War in May 1992. The village subsequently became part of the breakaway Republic of Artsakh as part of its Kashatagh Province, referred to as Arvakan. It was returned to Azerbaijan as part of the 2020 Nagorno-Karabakh ceasefire agreement on 1 December 2020.

References

External links 

Villages in Azerbaijan
Populated places in Lachin District